Ethel Dorothy Blondin-Andrew  (born 25 March 1951) is a Canadian politician, educator, and public servant. She became the first Indigenous woman to be elected to the Parliament of Canada in 1988 when she became a member of Parliament for the district of Western Arctic in the Northwest Territories. She is also the first Indigenous woman to be a Canadian Cabinet Minister.

Early life 
Blondin-Andrew was born 25 March 1951 in Tulita, Northwest Territories. She is a Dene woman. In 1959, she was sent to Grollier Hall in Inuvik, a residential school. She left the school to live in a tent town with other runaway students. When she was twelve, she went to the hospital for back surgery and discovered that she was ill with tuberculosis. After she recovered, she moved to Délı̨nę with her parents, where a local priest wrote her a recommendation letter for Grandin College, a leadership school in Fort Smith, which accepted her application.

She received a B.Ed from the University of Alberta in 1974, specialising in linguistics and literacy. In 1984, she became National Manager of the Indigenous Development Participation Programme which was run by the Canadian Public Service. She was appointed executive director two years later.

Political career 
In 1986, she became Assistant Deputy Minister of Culture for the Northwest Territories. In this role, she became involved in the Assembly of First Nations Aboriginal Language Foundation and the North American Language Institute. She was approached to run for the Territorial Council of the Northwest Territories but instead she ran to be Member of Parliament for the Western Arctic in the 1988 federal election. She won and while an MP, she became the Liberal Party's Assistant Critic for employment equity and Aboriginal affairs. She also served as chair of the Northern and Western Caucus and the Caucus Committee on Aboriginal Affairs, and as a member of the Special Joint Committee on a Renewed Canada, the Standing Committee on Aboriginal Affairs, the Standing Committee on Northern Development, and the Standing Committee on Electoral Reform. She gave her first speech in the House of Commons in the Dene language.

Following the 1993 federal election, the Liberal Party became the majority party and when Jean Chrétien became Prime Minister, Blondin-Andrew was appointed Secretary of State for Training and Youth on 4 November 1993. She helped create both Youth Service Canada and the Youth Employment Strategy. On 10 August 1998, she was elected chair for the Main Committee of the World Conference of Ministers Responsible for Youth in Lisbon. On 11 June 1997, she became Secretary of State (Children and Youth).

When Paul Martin succeed Jean Chrétien as Prime Minister, he appointed Blondin-Andrew as Minister of State (Children and Youth) on December 12, 2003. She served in this role until 20 July 2004, when she became Minister of State (Northern Development). She was re-elected in the 2004 federal election by a razor-thin margin of 53 votes, and was voted out of office in the 2006 federal election, after 17 years of service.

In 2001, her work for Aboriginal communities was formally recognized by Brock University, who awarded her an honorary doctorate. She was also awarded a Queen Elizabeth II Diamond Jubilee Medal by the Governor General of Canada in 2012. She also received the 2019 Maclean's Lifetime Achievement Award given to former MPs.

Later career 
Blondin-Andrew was the Chair of Sahtu Secretarial Incorporated from 2009 until September 2018. She currently works with the Indigenous Leadership Initiative.

Personal life 
Blondin-Andrew currently lives in Norman Wells. She is married to Leon Andrew and has four children and four grandchildren.

See also
Notable Aboriginal people of Canada

Select publications
Live your dreams: by following our vision, aboriginals are changing perceptions and inspiring others. Aboriginal Voices. 6:15 July/Aug. 1999

Electoral history

External links
 How'd They Vote?: Ethel Blondin-Andrew's voting history and quotes

References

1951 births
Living people
20th-century Canadian women politicians
21st-century Canadian women politicians
20th-century First Nations people
21st-century First Nations people
Dene people
Indigenous Members of the House of Commons of Canada
First Nations women in politics
Liberal Party of Canada MPs
Members of the 26th Canadian Ministry
Members of the 27th Canadian Ministry
Members of the House of Commons of Canada from the Northwest Territories
Women government ministers of Canada
Women in Northwest Territories politics
Women members of the House of Commons of Canada
Officers of the Order of Canada